Shanghai Gypsy is a 2012 Slovenian drama film directed by Marko Nabersnik.

Cast 
 Visar Vishka as Lutvija Belmondo Mirga
 Aslı Bayram as Amanda
 Senad Bašić as Ujas Mirga
 Marjuta Slamic as Phirav Pao
 Jasna Diklić as Baka Rajka
 Miodrag Trifunov as Deda Jorga

References

External links 

 Shanghai Gypsy at Eurochannel

2012 drama films
2012 films
Films about Romani people
Slovenian drama films